Táohuā (桃花) could refer to the following locations in China:

 Taohua, Feixi County, Anhui
 Taohua, Yu County, Hebei, town
 Taohua, Nanchang, town in Xihu District, Nanchang, Jiangxi
 Taohua, Zhoushan, town in Putuo District, Zhoushan, Zhejiang